is an electoral district of the Japanese House of Representatives. The district was established in 2022 and will elect its first representative in the 2025 general election.

Areas Covered

Current District 
As of 11 January 2023, the areas covered by this district are as follows:

 Arakawa
 Adachi (Tobu Isesaki Line, Kanjo Route 7, west of Otakebashi Street)
 Iko 1-5 , Iko Honmachi 1-2 , Iriya 1-9 , Iriya, Ougi 1-3 , Kono 1-2 , Kodai 1-2 , Kaga 1-2 , Kurihara 3- 4, Kohoku 1-7, Furjiya 1-2, Furujiya Honcho 1-4, Saranuma 1-3, Shikahama 1-8, Nitta 1-3, Tsubaki 1-2, Toneri 1-6 , Toneri Park , Toneri-cho , Nishiarai 1-7 , Nishiarai Sakaecho 3 , Nishiarai Honcho 1-5 , Nishiike 1-4, Nishiike-cho , Nishitakenotsuka 1-2 , Higashiiko 1-4 ,Horinouchi 1-2 , Miyagi 1-2 , Motoki 1-2 , Motoki Higashimachi , Motoki Nishimachi , Motoki Minamimachi , Motoki Kitamachi, Yazaike 1-3

Before the creation of this district, Arakawa was a part of the 14th district, and the west of Adachi was plit between the 12th and 13th districts.

Elected Representatives

Election Results

References 

Adachi, Tokyo
Arakawa, Tokyo
Constituencies established in 2022
National Diet
Districts of Tokyo